Two and a Half Men is an American television sitcom that began broadcast on CBS on September 22, 2003, and ended on February 19, 2015, after twelve seasons. Originally starring Charlie Sheen, Jon Cryer, and Angus T. Jones, the show was  about a hedonistic jingle writer, Charlie Harper; his uptight brother Alan; and Alan's son Jake. After Alan divorces, he moves with his son to share Charlie's beachfront Malibu house and complicates Charlie's freewheeling life.

The show has received multiple award nominations. It has been nominated for 46 Primetime Emmy Awards (winning six technical awards, one for Kathy Bates for Outstanding Guest Actress in a Comedy Series as The Ghost of Charlie Harper, and two for Jon Cryer as Alan Harper), and has also received two Golden Globe Award nominations for Charlie Sheen for Best Actor in a Television Series – Musical or Comedy. The show won the award for Favorite TV Comedy at the 35th People's Choice Awards.

Primetime Emmy Awards

Golden Globe Awards

Screen Actors Guild Awards

Teen Choice Awards

People's Choice Awards

ALMA Awards

References

External links 
 at CBS
Two and a Half Men at Facebook
Two and a Half Men at Warner TV

List of Two and a Half Men Episodes at TV Guide

Awards
Lists of awards by television series